A supersonic expansion fan, technically known as Prandtl–Meyer expansion fan, a two-dimensional simple wave, is a centered expansion process that occurs when a supersonic flow turns around a convex corner. The fan consists of an infinite number of Mach waves, diverging from a sharp corner. When a flow turns around a smooth and circular corner, these waves can be extended backwards to meet at a point. 

Each wave in the expansion fan turns the flow gradually (in small steps). It is physically impossible for the flow to turn through a single "shock" wave because this would violate the second law of thermodynamics. 

Across the expansion fan, the flow accelerates (velocity increases) and the Mach number increases, while the static pressure, temperature and density decrease. Since the process is isentropic, the stagnation properties (e.g. the total pressure and total temperature) remain constant across the fan.

The theory was described by Theodor Meyer on his thesis dissertation in 1908, along with his advisor Ludwig Prandtl, who had already discussed the problem a year before.

Flow properties 
The expansion fan consists of an infinite number of expansion waves or Mach lines. The first Mach line is at an angle  with respect to the flow direction, and the last Mach line is at an angle  with respect to final flow direction. Since the flow turns in small angles and the changes across each expansion wave are small, the whole process is isentropic. This simplifies the calculations of the flow properties significantly. Since the flow is isentropic, the stagnation properties like stagnation pressure, stagnation temperature and stagnation density remain constant. The final static properties are a function of the final flow Mach number and can be related to the initial flow conditions as follows, where  is the heat capacity ratio of the gas (1.4 for air):

The Mach number after the turn is related to the initial Mach number and the turn angle by,

where,  is the Prandtl–Meyer function. This function determines the angle through which a sonic flow (M = 1) must turn to reach a particular Mach number (M). Mathematically,

 

By convention, 

Thus, given the initial Mach number, one can calculate  and using the turn angle find . From the value of  one can obtain the final Mach number and the other flow properties. The velocity field in the expansion fan, expressed in polar coordinates  are given by

Maximum turn angle 

 

This places a limit on how much a supersonic flow can turn through, with the maximum turn angle given by,

 

One can also look at it as follows. A flow has to turn so that it can satisfy the boundary conditions. In an ideal flow, there are two kinds of boundary condition that the flow has to satisfy,
 Velocity boundary condition, which dictates that the component of the flow velocity normal to the wall be zero. It is also known as no-penetration boundary condition.
 Pressure boundary condition, which states that there cannot be a discontinuity in the static pressure inside the flow (since there are no shocks in the flow).

If the flow turns enough so that it becomes parallel to the wall, we do not need to worry about pressure boundary condition. However, as the flow turns, its static pressure decreases (as described earlier). If there is not enough pressure to start with, the flow won't be able to complete the turn and will not be parallel to the wall. This shows up as the maximum angle through which a flow can turn. The lower the Mach number is to start with (i.e. small ), the greater the maximum angle through which the flow can turn.

The streamline which separates the final flow direction and the wall is known as a slipstream (shown as the dashed line in the figure). Across this line there is a jump in the temperature, density and tangential component of the velocity (normal component being zero). Beyond the slipstream the flow is stagnant (which automatically satisfies the velocity boundary condition at the wall). In case of real flow, a shear layer is observed instead of a slipstream, because of the additional no-slip boundary condition.

Notes

See also 
 Gas dynamics
 Mach wave
 Oblique shock
 Shock wave
 Shadowgraph technique
 Schlieren photography
 Sonic boom

References

External links 
 Expansion fan (NASA)
 Prandtl- Meyer expansion fan calculator (Java applet).

Aerodynamics
Conservation equations
Fluid dynamics